John Keough (born 1835; date of death unknown) was a Union Army officer in the American Civil War who received the U.S. military's highest decoration, the Medal of Honor.

Keough was born in County Tipperary, Ireland in 1835 and it is believed he entered service in Annapolis, Maryland or Albany, New York. He was awarded the Medal of Honor for extraordinary heroism shown on April 6, 1865, while serving as a Corporal with Company E, 67th Pennsylvania Infantry, at the Battle of Sayler's Creek, in Virginia. Keough won his medal for capturing the battle flag of the Confederate States Army's 50th Georgia Infantry. His Medal of Honor was issued on May 10, 1865.

It is not known when Keough died, or where he was buried.

Medal of Honor citation

External links

References

1835 births
Date of birth unknown
Year of death unknown
American Civil War recipients of the Medal of Honor
People from County Tipperary
Irish-born Medal of Honor recipients
Irish emigrants to the United States (before 1923)
Union Army officers
United States Army Medal of Honor recipients